Five ships of the Royal Navy have borne the name HMS Ark Royal:

 , the flagship of the English fleet during the Spanish Armada campaign of 1588
 , planned as freighter, built as seaplane carrier during the First World War, renamed Pegasus in 1934
 , British aircraft carrier launched in 1937 that participated in the Second World War and was sunk by a U-boat in 1941
 , an  launched in 1950, decommissioned in 1979

Battle honours
 Armada 1588
 Cádiz 1596
 Dardanelles 1915
 Norway 1940
 Spartivento 1940
 Mediterranean 1940–1941
 Bismarck 1941
 Malta Convoys 1941
 Al Faw 2003

References

Royal Navy ship names